Piprahiya is a village in the southeastern part of Arrah block in Bhojpur district, Bihar, India. As of 2011, its population was 2,465, in 371 households.

References 

Villages in Bhojpur district, India